Security Branch may refer to:

 Security Branch (South Africa), a defunct police unit also known as the Special Branch
Security Bureau (Hong Kong)
 A former name of the Canadian Forces Military Police